= Vilmos Tauffer =

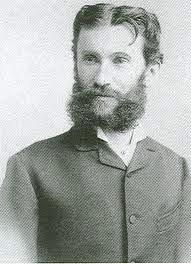
Vilmos Tauffer

Vilmos Tauffer (Cluj-Napoca, 2 July 1851 – Budapest, 7 December 1934) was a Hungarian obstetrician, gynecologist, and university professor. He was a pioneer in his field in Hungary, founding a school and reforming midwife training, and was among the country's leading obstetricians. He is especially remembered for developing the first obstetrics registry in Hungary. He began collecting data in 1991 and published it in 1891. The present-day registry is still known as the Tauffer database.
